The International Association of Professional Translators and Interpreters (IAPTI) is an international professional association of translators and interpreters based in Argentina.

History
Based in Buenos Aires, Argentina, IAPTI was established on 30 September 2009, Saint Jerome's day. Created by a group of professional language mediators as a vehicle for promoting ethical practices in translation and interpretation and providing a forum for discussing problems typical of the globalized world, such as crowdsourcing, outsourcing, bad rates and other abuse. Technological-ethical issues are also important to IAPTI, such as the exploitation of language professionals as cheap proofreaders of machine-translated texts.

It was founded by Aurora Humarán, an Argentinian sworn translator, Corresponding Member of the North American Academy of the Spanish Language, and marketing specialist.

IAPTI applied for registration as a civil association in the City of Buenos Aires (Argentina). Its legal registration under the name "International Association of Professional Translators and Interpreters" took a long time to process with the Office of the Argentine Inspector-General for Justice. On 23 February 2017 it was announced that the Inspector-General for Justice has finally approved IAPTI as a civil association.

According to its bylaws, the Association is directed and managed by a Board of Directors made up of the six following officers: President, Vice President, Secretary General, Treasurer, two Voting Members and two Alternate Voting Members.

Events, webinars, publications
IAPTI has held four international conferences, in London (2013), Athens (2014), Bordeaux (2015), and the fourth conference was held in Buenos Aires in April 2017 at the Claridge Hotel, the same venue where the association was established eight years before.

The organization also offers free webinars and other courses to its members, as well as a digital newsletter The IAPTImes.

Partnerships
In 2013, IAPTI joined forces with AIIC, Red T and FIT in the Open Letter Project, which had been launched in 2012. Later they were also joined by Critical Link International, the International Council for the Development of Community Interpreting (CLI), and the World Association of Sign Language Interpreters (WASLI).

They have sent open letters addressing several issues, among others:
 put pressure on governments to ensure the long-term safety of linguists who served their troops in Afghanistan
 ask the President of the United States for consideration with translators and interpreters in the wake of war against ISIS
 advocate for the UN to pass a resolution declaring the 30 September as International Translation Day

Honorary members
Its honorary members are the following:
Noam Chomsky
Mona Baker
Valentín García Yebra (in memoriam)
Sergio Viaggio
Fernando Navarro
Suzanne Jill Levine
Ricardo Chiesa
Lucille Barnes
Madeleine Lee
David Bellos

Supports 
Since 2009 language professionals from several countries have been active members of IAPTI, such as interpreter Tony Rosado or academic Mona Baker. Further, IAPTI's actions regarding freedom of expression of translators and interpreters received support from the New England Translators Association.

References

External links
IAPTI website

International professional associations
Professional associations based in Argentina
Translation associations
Interpreters associations
Organizations established in 2009
2009 establishments in Argentina